Chiu Chih-wei (born 24 July 1972) is a Taiwanese politician and a member of the Legislative Yuan. A Hakka descent, he is a member of the Democratic Progressive Party. He has a Ph.D. degree from the National Sun Yat-sen University (NSYSU). He served as Kaohsiung's chief of bureau of civil affairs between 2007 and 2011. He was elected into the Legislative Yuan representing Kaohsiung 2nd district since 2012. He was reelected in 2016.

Parliamentary career 
Chiu resigned his position as the chief of Kaohsiung Bureau of Civil Affairs in order to run for a seat in the 2012 election. In the 2012 election, he defeated a four-term veteran Lin Yi-shih in the general election, thus elected as the Member of Legislative Yuan for Kaohsiung 2. During his tenure, he served in two committees: Education and Cultural Committee and Foreign Affairs and National Defense Committee.

Electoral Records 
Incumbents are in bold

2012 
 All registered: 249,535
 Voters (turnout): 194,515 (77.95%)
 Valid (percentage): 192,021 (98.72%)
 Rejected (percentage): 2,494 (1.28%)

2016 
 All registered: 256,424
 Voters (turnout): 178,539 (69.63%)
 Valid (percentage): 175,247 (98.16%)
 Rejected (percentage): 3,292 (1.84%)

References 

Democratic Progressive Party Members of the Legislative Yuan
National Sun Yat-sen University alumni
1972 births
Living people
Members of the 8th Legislative Yuan
Members of the 9th Legislative Yuan
Kaohsiung Members of the Legislative Yuan
Taiwanese politicians of Hakka descent
Taiwanese people of Hakka descent
Members of the 10th Legislative Yuan